Steffen Warias (born 1 January 1985 in Tübingen) is a para-cyclist from Germany. He won medals in cycling at the 2012 and 2016 Summer Paralympics. He is set to compete in Cycling at the 2020 Summer Paralympics.

References

External links
 
 

1985 births
Living people
German male cyclists
Paralympic cyclists of Germany
Paralympic medalists in cycling
Paralympic gold medalists for Germany
Paralympic silver medalists for Germany
Cyclists at the 2012 Summer Paralympics
Cyclists at the 2016 Summer Paralympics
Cyclists at the 2020 Summer Paralympics
Medalists at the 2012 Summer Paralympics
Medalists at the 2016 Summer Paralympics
Sportspeople from Tübingen
Cyclists from Baden-Württemberg